The Bluffer's Guides are a collection of humorous pocket-sized guidebooks, written by experts and offering readers the opportunity to pass off appropriated knowledge as their own on a variety of subjects. The series has sold five million copies worldwide.

History

The guides were published between 1965 and 1975 in England, where four million copies of 16 books in the series were purchased. Peter Wolfe, the series' first publisher, sold its publication rights to Anne Taute, a second British publisher. Doug Lincoln, a CliffNotes vice president, discovered the guides while strolling through the Frankfurt Book Fair. He saw a throng of viewers looking at the Bluffer's Guides. Wolfe entered into an agreement with Taute to publish the guides in the United States under the CliffNotes brand.

The Fort Worth Star-Telegrams Terry Lee Goodrich wrote that the Bluffer's Guides have been referred to as the CliffsNotes of life. The books in the series are roughly 60 percent humor and 40 percent truth, Goodrich wrote.

In 2014, the then publishing group nominated British media personality Katie Hopkins as the first recipient of their "Dishonours list", to recognise bad behaviour and etiquette. Company representative Thomas Drewry said, "There isn't a single person in the UK who Katie Hopkins hasn't offended this year".

In 2018, the Bluffer's Guide series was acquired by Haynes.

List of books and authors 

Daniel Hudson, author of The Bluffer's Guide to the Cosmos. 
Francis Coleman, author of The Bluffer's Guides to Ballet and Opera. 
William Hanson, author of The Bluffer's Guide to Etiquette. 
André Launay, author of The Bluffer's Guide to Antiques.
Peter Clayton, co-author of The Bluffer's Guide to Jazz.
Ross Leckie, author of The Bluffer's Guide to the Classics. 
Thomas V. Morris, author of The Bluffer's Guide to Philosophy.
Michael Toner, author of The Bluffer’s Guide to the EU.
Boris Starling, author of The Bluffer's Guide to Brexit.
Jonathan Goodall, author of The Bluffer's Guide to Beer.
Susie Boniface, author of The Bluffer's Guide to Journalism.
Keith Hann, author of The Bluffer's Guide to Opera.

References

External links 
Bluffers.com
BBC interview with William Hanson, Bluffer’s Guide to Etiquette
BBC interview with William Hanson, Bluffer’s Guide to Etiquette
Article in the Daily Mirror newspaper by William Hanson, Bluffer’s Guide to Etiquette
Article in The Daily Express newspaper by Neil Davey, Bluffer’s Guide to Chocolate
Review of Bluffer’s Guide to Jazz in The Daily Telegraph
Article by Emma Smith in The Huffington Post, The Bluffer’s Guide to Camping
BBC Radio 4 interview with Ross Leckie, Bluffer’s Guide to the Classics 
BBC Radio 4 interview with Ross Leckie, Bluffer’s Guide to the Classics
, Intellectual Property Office

Publishing companies of the United Kingdom